The Gentofte Stars are an ice hockey team in the , the second-highest men’s ice hockey league in Denmark. The team previously played in the Metal Ligaen but were relegated in 2018 due to financial troubles.

The parent club,  Club Gentofte Stars, also has a representative women's ice hockey team (which previously played in the Danish Championship league during 2011 to 2016), active sections in minor and junior ice hockey, and recreational teams for a number of age groups.

History
The ice hockey section of the Hellerup IK sports club was founded on April 23, 1965. The club made their debut in the AL-Bank Ligaen for the 1967–68 season. The ice hockey section of Hellerup IK participated regularly in the AL-Bank Ligaen for many years, before becoming independent in 1996 for to financial reasons and rebranding as IC Gentofte. Gentofte participated in the AL-Bank Ligaen for three more years, in 1997, 1998, and 1999, before withdrawing due to financial issues. The club qualified for the promotion/relegation round of the AL-Bank Ligaen in the 2000 and 2002 seasons, but failed to earn a promotion to the league.

Team roster

Notable players
Michael de Angelis
Matthias Asperup
Wayne Gagné
Cody Kunyk
Lauri Kärmeniemi
 Alexander Kuzminski
Markus Lauridsen
Oliver Lauridsen
 Rasmus Olsen
Ossi Saarinen
 Frederik Storm
 Alexander Sundberg

References

Ice hockey teams in Denmark
Ice hockey clubs established in 1965
1965 establishments in Denmark